The discography of Sean Kingston, a Jamaican American reggae fusion singer, consists of four studio albums, twenty-one singles and five music videos.

His self-titled debut album was released on July 31, 2007, and debuted at number 6 on the US Billboard 200 albums chart and was certified platinum for over 1,000,000 shipments in the United States. The album features its lead single, "Beautiful Girls". The song climbed to number 1 on the Billboard Hot 100 in 2007, then was certified 2× multi-platinum by the Recording Industry Association of America (RIAA). The following singles released all made the Hot 100; however, only one failed to make the Top 40 of the chart. The second and third singles, "Me Love" and "Take You There", reached number 14 and number 7 on the Hot 100, respectively. Kingston's second album, Tomorrow; was released on September 22, 2009.

Albums

Studio albums

Mixtapes

Singles

As lead artist

As featured artist

Other charted songs

Guest appearances

Notes

References

Pop music discographies
Rhythm and blues discographies
 
 
Discographies of American artists
Discographies of Jamaican artists